Mariusz Tomasz Lemańczyk is a Polish mathematician known for his contributions in ergodic theory and dynamical systems. He graduated from the Nicolaus Copernicus University in Toruń in 1981, in mathematics, and completed his PhD in 1985. In 1987, he received the Kazimierz Kuratowski Prize, considered one of the most prestigious awards for young Polish mathematicians. He received his habilitation at the University of Warsaw in 1991, after which he joined the faculty at Nicolaus Copernicus University. In 1997, he received the Stefan Banach Prize from the Polish Mathematical Society. In 2016, he held the Jean-Morlet Chair at the Centre International de Rencontres Mathématiques. In July, 2022 he gave an invited lecture on the International Congress of Mathematicians.

References

Living people
Polish mathematicians
Nicolaus Copernicus University in Toruń alumni
University of Warsaw alumni
Academic staff of Nicolaus Copernicus University in Toruń
People from Toruń
1958 births